Assembly Square is a neighborhood in Somerville, Massachusetts. It is located along the west bank of the Mystic River, bordered by Ten Hills and Massachusetts Route 28 to the north and the Charlestown neighborhood of Boston to the south. The district's western border runs along Interstate 93. Located  from downtown Boston, the  parcel is named for a former Ford Motor Company plant that closed in 1958.

The area is home to Assembly Row, a  mixed-use, smart growth development that broke ground in April 2012 and opened in 2014. It includes retail outlets, restaurants, residential space, office and research and development space, a 12-screen cinema and a 200-room hotel. Other amenities include a marina, a revitalized waterfront park, bike paths and other green space.

Assembly Row's first stage of development was the Assembly Square Marketplace. Completed in 2006, the marketplace is a "power center" that comprises retail stores Christmas Tree Shops, Burlington, Trader Joe's, Staples, TJMaxx, and Bed Bath & Beyond.

The area is served by the MBTA Orange Line at Assembly station.

History

Early use
In the 17th century, the southern bank of the Mystic River, a low-lying tidal marsh and wetlands area bordered by uplands further south in the current Ten Hills neighborhood, was avoided by the early settlers because of poorly draining clay soils. The highland site on Ten Hills offered better agricultural land and the first Governor of Massachusetts, John Winthrop, chose it for the site of his farmstead. The location of the Ten Hills site on the Mystic River made it a natural choice for the transport of people and goods, and the first seagoing vessel built in this region was launched from there.

Trade and transport led to an expansion of the area’s economy and population. The construction of the Middlesex Canal at the end of the 18th century accelerated this process. By the early 1800s, there were 10 shipyards along the Mystic River. The area had developed into a transportation corridor from Boston to the region. At mid-century, rail surpassed the canal as the most efficient mode of transport and the construction of two railroads across Somerville in 1845 and 1854, along with the opening of a station at Sullivan Square, brought even more development to the area.

Industrial development
It was not until the construction of the McGrath Highway in 1925 that full industrial development, albeit short-lived, took hold in Somerville. The Ford Motor Company built an assembly plant here in 1926, which would, over time, lend Assembly Square its name. Additionally, the Boston and Maine Railroad also owned large tracts of land in the district and the land was criss-crossed by spur tracks. With both road and rail connections, the strong transportation infrastructure was a major draw, and other industries soon followed, including First National Stores, a retail supermarket chain, which opened a grocery manufacturing and distribution center in the area.

Within the next 30 years, Assembly Square remained one of the largest employment centers in the region. However, in 1958, as a result of the failure of the Edsel Division of the Ford Motor Company and the change in Ford’s manufacturing strategies, the Assembly Plant was closed. It hurt the area both economically and physically, taking away hundreds of jobs and leaving a vast complex of empty manufacturing buildings. First National moved into the Assembly Plant site shortly after Ford's departure.

By the late 1950s and early 1960s, industries were already making the choice to move to suburban locations along newly constructed highways, where land costs were lower. The construction of the elevated Northern Expressway portion of Interstate 93 in the 1970s segregated the uses on both sides of the highway and significantly reduced its access and visibility from the surrounding areas. In 1976, First National closed its operations, marking the end of Assembly Square as a major industrial employment center.

Redevelopment
In 1979, the City of Somerville declared the Assembly Square District to be blighted and substandard, and adopted the "Assembly Square Revitalization Plan," a 20-year urban renewal plan, in an effort to assist in redevelopment. Under the direction of the plan, the area’s focus began to shift to retail, the cornerstone of which was the rehabilitation of the former auto assembly plant into a retail mall, Assembly Square Mall. It was like many smaller “dumbbell” style malls of its era, with an anchor at each end of the mall and a straight hallway between, and a food court in the center. A six-screen movie theater and a four-story office building were also built on the site. Two new roadways, Assembly Square Drive and New Road, were constructed to improve access.

At the mall, the anchor stores remained the same until 1996 when Macy's acquired the Jordan Marsh chain and shuttered the store in 1997. By 1999, the mall had been closed off except for Kmart and Building 19, which had the year prior moved into the old Macy's/Jordan Marsh space.

In 1998, Mystic View Task Force, a citizens group, was formed to advocate for community interests in future Assembly projects. A vision emerged from the forum, of a pedestrian-oriented mixed-use development that could provide 30 additional acres of usable open space, over 30,000 diverse jobs, and over $30 million in new net tax revenue. Mystic View presented evidence that, developed as an office-based neighborhood with supporting retail and housing, Assembly Square could easily achieve those goals. But in order to do that, big-box behemoths — which had dominated much of the Assembly discussion — could not be an option.

In 1999, the internationally known Swedish home furnishings store IKEA purchased two former industrial sites on the Mystic River waterfront. IKEA obtained permits for its proposed retail store; however, the permits were challenged in court by community members opposed to a "big box" use on the waterfront, with the result that redevelopment of the site was stalled for a number of years.

Smart growth development
In 2000, the Somerville Redevelopment Authority (SRA) acquired title to a 9.3-acre former railroad parcel in Assembly Square and issued an RFP for developers.  At the same time, the City initiated an extensive public planning process, producing the "2000 Planning Study" which set out a new vision for Assembly Square as a 24-hour mixed use district with residential, retail, office, cinema, restaurant, hotel, and recreational open space uses. In 2002, the SRA and the City adopted a 20-year extension of the urban renewal plan with the goal of transforming Assembly Square into the mixed-use district described in the 2000 Planning Study. Assembly Square was rezoned to promote the mixed-use concept, and design guidelines and a design review committee were created to provide additional assistance.

In 2005, Federal Realty Investment Trust (FRIT), a Maryland-based real estate investment trust and developer, purchased the defunct Assembly Square Mall along with other properties in Assembly Square. FRIT quickly redeveloped the existing mall into the Assembly Square Marketplace. The next year the strip mall opened, with Christmas Tree Shops, A.C. Moore, Sports Authority, Staples, Inc., and other big-box stores.

Later in 2006, Somerville Mayor Joseph Curtatone aided in bringing FRIT and IKEA together to come up with a feasible redevelopment plan consistent with the new vision. FRIT and IKEA agreed to trade parcels, moving IKEA inland from its initial site and leaving the waterfront open for FRIT to create pedestrian friendly, mixed-use development.  The new plan, developed by Street-Works Studio LLC for Federal Realty, integrated residential, office, retail and open space across the site and embraced the waterfront for public use and a future transit stop. Street-Works Studio worked with project-wide consultants to ensure phasing, retail connectedness, developed design guidelines, and brought an important human-scale aesthetic to the project, thinking of the "whole" and every user experience, not just on a block by block basis.  This new plan was welcomed by those who had previously opposed the IKEA development. The land swap was executed in October 2009 solidifying the vision of the district. 

After more than a decade of planning, IKEA formally pulled out of the Assembly Square project in July 2012, stating that its Stoughton store was sufficient to serve the state. This sale means that FRIT owns nearly all of the property at Assembly Square.

After two years of preparing the former brownfields site, the ground was broken in April 2012 for two residential apartment blocks, a new main street, and a new MBTA transit infill station.  The apartment buildings, the Avalon at Assembly Square (195 units) and AVA Somerville (253 units), are designed by Elkus Manfredi Architects and developed by AvalonBay Communities Inc., a US-based Real Estate Investment Trust and manager of luxury apartments.

In 2016, Sports Authority closed after the chain went out of business and was replaced by Burlington in 2018. A.C. Moore also closed in 2016 and was replaced by Trader Joe's in 2017, with Xfinity joining in 2019. 

On September 3, 2019, Sears announced that Kmart would be closing in November 2019.

Marketplace
Assembly Square Marketplace is a retail park and mixed-use development located in Assembly Square. From the 1980s until the mid-2000s, it was an enclosed shopping mall called Assembly Square Mall. Scheduled plans for the facility call for a six phased expansion, thus changing its classification into super regional mall.  of office, retail, residential, research and development, hospitality and entertainment space are envisioned by project completion in 2011.

Marketplace history
Assembly Square Mall opened in 1980. The mall building was previously occupied by Somerville Assembly, a Ford Motor Company factory, and was later used as a supermarket distribution center before its conversion to a mall.

The  mall was originally anchored by a  Jordan Marsh and a  Kmart. These anchor stores remained the same until 1996, when Macy's acquired Jordan Marsh. Macy's closed the store in 1997, and by 1999, it was replaced with Building 19.

Shortly after Building 19 opened, the mall was closed off except for Building 19 and Kmart. The vacant mall and Building 19 spaces were gutted and reconfigured in 2005. The Kmart store remained in place.  

The new Assembly Square Marketplace was completed in early 2006 with the current stores including Staples (in the former Building 19), Burlington, Bed Bath & Beyond, TJ Maxx & HomeGoods, Trader Joe's, and Christmas Tree Shops. The area around the mall will be redeveloped as an "urban village"-style development. Kmart closed in November 2019.

Ownership and occupants

The property owner and lead developer for both Assembly Row and Assembly Square Marketplace is Federal Realty Investment Trust (FRIT), a Maryland-based real estate investment trust.

The first Legoland Discovery Centre in New England and seventh in the United States is located on the property. The indoor family entertainment center based on Lego construction toys is housed in a  space opened in Spring 2014. In addition to Legoland, Nike has signed a deal to open a store at Assembly, as did the French cookware maker Le Creuset. Other retailers will include Brooks Brothers, women’s clothier Chico's, and the ice cream shop J.P. Licks. AMC Theatres is also opening a 12-screen cinema on the property. Among the new restaurants are the Mexican eatery Papagayo, and Earls Kitchen + Bar, which opened its first Northeast US location at Assembly Row.

In December 2013, Partners HealthCare System, the state's largest hospital and physician organization, announced it will consolidate administrative operations from 14 sites in eastern Massachusetts and move 4,500 non-hospital employees into  of a new office building already opened as of 2016. While the company’s executive headquarters will remain in Boston, offices throughout the region, including locations in Charlestown, Wellesley and Needham will close.

In early September 2014, Legal Sea Foods opened "Legal on the Mystic", a  restaurant overlooking the Mystic River. The Assembly Row website gives information on the new neighborhood businesses and eateries.

In November 2014, SmartBear Software announced the move of their headquarters from Beverly, Massachusetts to Assembly Row. Their  office houses their 100+ headquartered employees.

Parks

On the north side of Assembly Square is the Mystic River.  From Route 28 to the MBTA Orange Line and Haverhill Line tracks is the waterfront Sylvester Baxter Riverfront Park.  This was redeveloped as part of Assembly Square construction, and enlarged with a land swap between FRIT and the Massachusetts Department of Conservation and Recreation (DCR).  DCR also owns the existing Draw 7 Park, which lies on a narrow strip next to the Mystic River as it curves southward between the Orange Line and the Newburyport/Rockport Line Commuter Rail tracks.

FRIT has also committed to building a pedestrian underpass to connect Baxter Park to the Somerville side of the Mystic River Reservation (the next segment being known as the Shore Drive Parklands).

References

External links
Assembly Row project site
Developer website
City of Somerville page
MBTA Project for Assembly Square Orange Line station
Deadmalls.com writeup

Buildings and structures in Somerville, Massachusetts
Mystic River
Neighborhoods in Somerville, Massachusetts
Populated places in Middlesex County, Massachusetts
Squares in Somerville, Massachusetts
Transit-oriented developments in the United States